Kazimierz Pietranek was a Polish professional football player from Sosnowiec. In the inter-war period he played for Unia Sosnowiec. He continued to play for Unia during World War II despite the many challenges of war, and he  continued to play for the club after the war, then-named Stal Sosnowiec. His nephew Lechosław Olsza went on to become a Polish international footballer.

References

Polish footballers
Poland international footballers
Place of birth missing (living people)
Association footballers not categorized by position
Zagłębie Sosnowiec players